A Staghound is a breed of scent hound bred for hunting stags.

Staghound may also refer to:

Dogs
 American Staghound, a crossbreed sighthound
 Devon and Somerset Staghounds, one of three packs maintained for hunting stag in the UK, the others being the Quantock Staghounds and the Tiverton Staghounds

Transportation
 Stag Hound, 1851 clipper ship, which was briefly the largest ship in the world
 Staghound (armored car), service name for T17 armored car